Hull Botanical Gardens were established in 1812 on a  site near what is now called Linnaeus Street, Hull, England.

In 1877 they moved to a  site in Spring Bank, Hull, but closed in 1889 due to financial difficulty.  In 1893 the site became the location of Hymers College.

The Hull Botanic Gardens railway station is a disused railway station named after the nearby gardens.

References

History of Kingston upon Hull
Botanical gardens in England
Gardens in the East Riding of Yorkshire